The 28th Kolkata International Film Festival was held from 15 - 22 December 2022 at Netaji Indoor Stadium, in Kolkata. The festival opened with 1973 film Abhimaan, by Hrishikesh Mukherjee. 183 films including 130 feature films and 52 short and documentary films from 42 countries were screened during 7 days of the festival. The opening ceremony was attended by West Bengal Chief Minister Mamata Banerjee, Amitabh Bachchan, Jaya Bachchan, Shah Rukh Khan, Rani Mukerjee and cricketer Sourav Ganguly.  

The festival closed on 22 December at Rabindra Sadan hosted by Saheb Chatterjee. Spanish film Upon Entry by Alejandro Rojas, and Juan Sebastian Vasquez and Bangladeshi film The Golden Wings of Watercocks by Muhammad Quayum, jointly won the Golden Royal Bengal Tiger Award for best film, whereas Golden Royal Bengal Tiger Award for best director was won by Ernesto Ardito and Virna Molina for their film Hitler's Witch.

Highlights of the year
Retrospective on Amitabh Bachchan
 
A retrospective on Amitabh Bachchan, celebrating his life and works, will be  presented by screening his films.

Paying homage through special tribute

Filmmaker Tarun Majumdar, veteran actor Pradip Mukherjee, classical musician Shivkumar Sharma and American actor Angela Lansbury, who all passed away in 2022, will be given special tribute in the festival.

Centenary celebration

Centenary tribute will be given to the French film director and screenwriter Alain Resnais, Italian filmmaker Pier Paolo Pasolini, Greek film actor and director Michael Cacoyannis, alongside Indian cinema’s legendary figures Dilip Kumar, Asit Sen, Hrishikesh Mukherjee, Bharati Devi, K. Asif and Hindustani classical musician Ali Akbar Khan.

Game On, A new category

From this year a new category 'Game On' will be introduced. Seven sports related films including Soumitra Chatterjee's 1984 film Kony, 2016 film M.S. Dhoni: The Untold Story, 2021 film 83 will be screened to promote sports among young generation.

Jury

International jury
International Competition: Innovation in Moving Images
 Iliana Zakopoulou, (Chairperson), Head of the Department of Sales and Promotion (Hellas Film) of the Greek Film Centre.
 Mano Khalil, a Kurdish-Swiss film director and producer 
 Shalini Dore, an editor with Variety 
 Tanvir Mokammel, current director of Bangladesh Film Institute (BFI) 
 Tannishtha Chatterjee, an Indian actress and director

Competition on Indian Language's Films
 Siddiq Barmak, (Chairperson), an Afghan film director and producer
 Gulnara Abikeyeva, a Kazakh film critic and film researcher
 Viera Langerová, Slovakian film critic, lecturer and scriptwriter
Asian Select (NETPAC Award)
 Latika Padgaonkar (Chairperson), a columnist, translator and editor of several books, also member of the NETPAC (India), and the FIPRESCI.
 Italo Spinelli, a director and author, the founder and artistic director of Asiatica International Film Festival, Rome
 Supriya Suri, the founding member of Cinedarbaar in India and a film curator, and runs her production company Maison Su.
Competition on Indian Short Films
 Jaya Seal Ghosh, an Indian actress, dancer and producer 
 Prasun Chatterjee, an Indian filmmaker, also the founder of Kathak Talkies, a Kolkata-based film production company
 Raajhorshee De, a writer and creative director, also project head for two channels in Bengal— Colors Bangla and Zee Bangla.
Competition on Indian Documentary Films
 Anindita Choudhury, the current Vice President of Original Content for Zee5 Kolkata and Bangladesh
 Manas Mukul Pal, an Indian film director and writer 
 Sani Ghose Ray, a creative entrepreneur. Currently heading Acropolis Entertainment Pvt. Ltd.

Official selection

Inaugural Film

Competition categories

International Competition: Innovation in Moving Images
Source: 

Highlighted title indicates award winner

Competition on Indian Language's Films
Source: 
Highlighted title indicates award winner

Asian Select (NETPAC Award)

Competition on Indian Short Films
Source:

Competition on Indian Documentary Films

Non-Competition Categories

Amitabh Bachchan: A Living Legend
Source:|

Bengali Panorama

Centenary tribute
 International

 Indian

Cinema International

Game On

Homage
Four films will be showcased to pay homage to Jean-Luc Godard, the French-Swiss film director, screenwriter, and film critic.

Short and Documentary Panorama

Special Screening
Source:

Special tribute

Unheard India: Rare Language Films
Source:

Winners 
Source:
 Golden Royal Bengal Tiger Award for Best Film: 
 Upon Entry 
 The Golden Wings of Watercocks
 Golden Royal Bengal Tiger Award for Best Director: Ernesto Ardito, Virna Molina for Hitler's Witch
 Golden Royal Bengal Tiger Award for Best Short: I Am, Mehmood by Prataya Saha
 Golden Royal Bengal Tiger Award for Best Documentary: Nybreum - The Unsettled Shade by Neha Sharma

 Special Jury mention (Innovation in Moving Pictures): Silent Glory by Nahid Hassanzadeh

 Hiralal Sen Memorial Award Best Film (Indian language's films) : Muthayya by Bhaskhar Maurya
 Hiralal Sen Memorial Award Best Director (Indian language's films) : Deepankar Prakash for Naanera 

Special Jury mention (Indian language's films):
 The Terrace by Indrani
 If Only Trees Could Talk by Dr. Bobby Sarma Baruah

 NETPAC Award for Best Film : Fortune by Muhiddin Muzaffar

 Special Jury mention (Indian Short Films): 
 Void by Nabapan Deka
  The Divine Touch by Dr. Prosenjit Choudhury

References

External links 
 

Kolkata International Film Festival
2022 film festivals
2022 festivals in Asia
2022 in Indian cinema